Gisela Cerezo (born 5 April 1956) is a Venezuelan former swimmer. She competed in two events at the 1972 Summer Olympics.

References

1956 births
Living people
Venezuelan female swimmers
Olympic swimmers of Venezuela
Swimmers at the 1972 Summer Olympics
Place of birth missing (living people)
Central American and Caribbean Games gold medalists for Venezuela
Central American and Caribbean Games medalists in swimming
Competitors at the 1974 Central American and Caribbean Games
20th-century Venezuelan women